Kalikaalam (Malayalam: കലികാലം) is a 2012 Malayalam drama film written and directed by Reji Nair. Focussing mainly on relationships, it tells the story of a mother and her three children. The film tries to explore the complexities of a small family. Scriptwriter Reji Nair makes his directorial debut with this film. Kalikalam was filmed by award-winning cinematographer Madhu Ambat. The film's music is by O. N. V. Kurup-Ousepachan team, who reunites once again after Akashadoothu (1992). The film was shot in Thalassery and nearby places.

Plot synopsis
The story is about Devaki, an active social reformer, who works as a teacher and mother of three children. The film deals with human relationships and explores the complexities that are generally faced in the life of a small family.

Cast
 Sharada as  Devaki Teacher
 Lalu Alex as Satheesh Nair
 Ashokan as Ravi Nair
Satthya  
 Suresh Krishna as Gouthaman Nair
 Shari as Meenakshi
 Leona Lishoy as Ananya
 Sadhika Venugopal as Shelly
J. Pallassery as Pilla
 Bheeman Raghu as C.I Chandran Nair
Sadhika Venugopal as Shelly
 Lakshmi Sharma as Suja Gouthaman
 Mamukkoya as  Mohammed Koya Master
Kulappulli Leela as Nani
 Kozhikode Narayanan Nair as Rajan Master
 Sreehari as Raghavan Nair
 Munshi Venu as Usman Master
 Anoop Chandran as Keshavan
Sathaar as Dr.Krishnadas
Parvathi T. as Dr.Shoshamma Kuriyan

Soundtrack

References

External links
 

2010s Malayalam-language films
Indian drama films
2012 directorial debut films
2012 films
Films shot in Kerala
Films shot in Thalassery
Films shot in Kannur
Films shot in Kozhikode
2012 drama films
Films scored by Ouseppachan